The Men's artistic gymnastics team all-around (AA) competition at the 2016 Summer Olympics in Rio de Janeiro was held on 8 August 2016 at the HSBC Arena.

The medals were presented by Tsunekazu Takeda (Japan), Ivo Ferriani (Italy) and Luis Alberto Moreno (Colombia) and members of the International Olympic Committee. Gifts were presented by Bruno Grandi (President of the FIG), Michel Léglise (Vice President of the FIG) and Jani Tanskanen (President of the Athletes' Commission for the FIG).

Competition format
The top 8 teams in qualifications, based on combined scores of each apparatus, advanced to the final. In the final, each team selected three gymnasts to compete on each apparatus. All scores on each apparatus were summed to give a final team score. The scores in qualification do not count in the final.

Qualified teams

Final

 Due to injury, Maksym Semiankiv did not score on any of his scheduled events, simply just touching the equipment.

 Official Results for the Artistic Gymnastics Men's Team Final.

References

Men's artistic team all-around
2016
Olympics
Men's events at the 2016 Summer Olympics